Kleptothule rasmusseni is a small, elongated trilobite, about 3 cm in length, and about 5 to 6 mm in width, from the Sirius Passet Lagerstätte. It is currently placed in the family Nevadiidae, though this may change with further study.

Its cephalon is composed of at least five segments, and its elongated thorax is composed of 27+ segments. The 20 or so segments of the pygidium are poorly defined, as they are fused together.

The original publication was in Transactions of the Royal Society of Edinburgh in 1995,

External links

 Peripatus Homepage "Trilobite Origins" 
https://web.archive.org/web/20070831114814/http://www.palaeos.com/Paleozoic/Cambrian/Sirius_Passet.html

Redlichiida
Cambrian trilobites
Cambrian animals of Europe
Cambrian arthropods of North America
Cambrian Greenland
Fossils of Greenland
Sirius Passet fossils
Buen Formation
Fossil taxa described in 1995

Cambrian genus extinctions